Luciano Valente (born 4 October 2003) is a professional footballer, who plays as an attacking midfielder for Groningen. Born in the Netherlands, he currently represents Italy at youth international level.

Club career 
Born in Groningen, Valente started playing football at local club GVAV-Rapiditas, before joining Groningen's youth sector in 2014. He subsequently came through the club's ranks, winning a national under-17 championship in 2019 in the process. In July 2021, he signed his first professional contract with Groningen and started training with the first team.

On 14 August 2022, Valente made his professional debut for Groningen, coming in as a substitute for Laros Duarte at the 79th minute of the Eredivisie match against Ajax, which ended in a 6-1 defeat for his side. On September 8, the midfielder extended his contract with the club until 2026, with an option for another season.

International career 

Being born from an Italian father and a Dutch mother, Valente has been able to choose to represent either countries internationally.

So far, the midfielder has represented the former country at various youth international levels, having featured for the Italian under-19 and under-20 national teams.

Style of play 
Valente is an attacking midfielder, who can also play in several positions through the middle. He has been praised for his strength and his positioning, as well as his ability to create chances, either for himself or his team-mates.

Personal life 
His father, Roberto, is Italian and works at a local pizzeria in Haren.

Career statistics

References

External links 

 
 

2003 births
Living people
Footballers from Groningen (city)
Italian footballers
Italy youth international footballers
Dutch footballers
Italian people of Dutch descent
Dutch people of Italian descent
Association football forwards
FC Groningen players
Eredivisie players